The following lists events that happened during 2008 in Belarus.

Incumbents
 President: Alexander Lukashenko
 Prime Minister: Sergei Sidorsky

Events

January
 January 18 - An editor of an independent newspaper who reproduced the controversial cartoons of Muhammad was jailed for three years.

References

 
Years of the 21st century in Belarus
Belarus
2000s in Belarus
Belarus